The International Racquetball Federation's 18th Racquetball World Championships were held in Cali, Colombia, from July 15 to 23, 2016. This was the first time Worlds were in Colombia, and the first time a South American country hosted the event since 1998, when Cochabamba, Bolivia, was the host city.

American Rocky Carson won gold for the fifth consecutive time, extending his career record, when he defeated Mexican Daniel De La Rosa, in the final, 15–11, 5–15, 11–5. But it was the first time that Carson needed a tie-breaker to win the final, and he also needed three games to advance to the final, as Bolivian Conrrado Moscoso took him to a tie-breaker in the semi-finals.

Tournament format
The 2016 World Championships used a two stage format with an initial group stage that was a round robin with the results used to seed players for a medal round.

Round robin

Pool A

Pool B

Pool C

Pool D

Pool E

Pool F

Pool G

Pool H

Pool I

Medal round

References

2016 Racquetball World Championships